In the 1854 Chicago mayoral election, Democrat Isaac Lawrence Milliken defeated Temperance Party nominee Amos G. Throop by a landslide 19.5% margin.

Throop had run previously in 1852.

Incumbent mayor Charles McNeill Gray did not run for reelection.

The election was held on March 13.

Campaigning
Throop had the support of the city's temperance forces. Milliken supported giving Catholics a portion of the school fund and did not support temperance.

Results

References

1854
Chicago
Chicago
1850s in Chicago